The Ghost Goes Gear is a 1966 British musical comedy film directed by Hugh Gladwish and starring the Spencer Davis Group, Sheila White and Nicholas Parsons.

Plot
A music group go to stay at the childhood home of their manager, a haunted manor house in the English countryside.

Cast
 Spencer Davis Group as Themselves
 Nicholas Parsons as Algernon Rowthorpe Plumley 
 Sheila White as Polly 
 Lorne Gibson as Ghost / Himself 
 Arthur Howard as Vicar 
 Jack Haig as Old Edwards
 Joan Ingram as Lady Rowthorpe 
 Tony Sympson as Lord Plumley 
 Emmett Hennessy as Butch 
 Robert Langley as Little Boy 
 Bernard Stone as Cockney Dad 
 Janet Davies as Cockney Wife 
 Huw Thomas as News presenter
 St. Louis Union as Themselves
 The Three Bells as Themselves
 Dave Berry as himself
 Acker Bilk as himself

References

External links

1966 films
1966 musical comedy films
British haunted house films
British musical comedy films
Films set in England
1960s English-language films
1960s British films